Lupinus antoninus is a rare species of lupine known by the common name Anthony Peak lupine. It is endemic to northern California, where it is known from only four occurrences in the North Coast Ranges, including near Anthony Peak.

Description
Lupinus antoninus grows in mountain forests often amongst firs. The herbage is coated in gray or silvery hairs. The flower is whitish with a light brownish wash on its banner.

References

External links
Jepson Manual Treatment: Lupinus antoninus
Lupinus antoninus Photo gallery

Further reading

antoninus
Endemic flora of California